The Teesta Torsha Express is a train in West Bengal, India which is named after two famous rivers River Teesta and River Torsha of North Bengal. One of the oldest trains between Kolkata & North Bengal, it runs between Sealdah (SDAH) & New Alipurduar (NOQ). It passes through some important cities of West Bengal such as Berhampore,  Malda, Siliguri, and Cooch Behar. It travels 718 km distance taking 17 hours with an average speed of 45 km/hr.

Type: Express

Rake: ICF

Rake Zone: ER

Stations
 (starts)
 
 
 Aluabari Road
 New Jalpaiguri
 
 
 
 
 
 
   (Ends)

Timing and schedule  

13141 (UP) - Starts daily from Sealdah at  Afternoon 14.45 and reaches New Alipurduar at 5.35 AM [as per latest revision in timings wef 01.02.2023]

13142 (DOWN)- Starts daily from New Alipurduar at 11:45 AM and reach Sealdah next Day at Morning 4:45 AM

Other trains on the Kolkata–New Jalpaiguri sector
 22301/02 Howrah–New Jalpaiguri Vande Bharat Express
 12041/42 New Jalpaiguri–Howrah Shatabdi Express
 22309/40 Howrah–New Jalpaiguri AC Express
 12377/78 Padatik Express
 12344/45 Darjeeling Mail
 15959/60 Kamrup Express
 13175/76 Kanchanjungha Express
 12345/46 Saraighat Express
 15722/23 New Jalpaiguri-Digha Express
 12518/19 Kolkata Garib Rath Express
 12526/27 Dibrugarh–Kolkata Superfast Express
 13141/42 Teesta Torsha Express
 13147/58 Uttar Banga Express
 12503/04 Bangalore Humsafar Express
 13181/82 Kolkata–Silghat Town Kaziranga Express
 22511/12 Lokmanya Tilak Terminus–Kamakhya Karmabhoomi Express
 12526/27 Dibrugarh–Kolkata Superfast Express
 15644/45 Puri–Kamakhya Weekly Express (via Howrah)
 12364/65 Kolkata–Haldibari Intercity Express
 12509/10 Guwahati–Bengaluru Cantt. Superfast Express
 12507/08 Thiruvananthapuram–Silchar Superfast Express
 12514/15 Guwahati–Secunderabad Express

References

External links 
 Up train timetable (Revised wef 01.02.2023)
 Down train timetable

Transport in Kolkata
Railway services introduced in 1992
Named passenger trains of India
Rail transport in West Bengal
Express trains in India
Transport in Alipurduar